Edward Archibald Mitchell (December 2, 1910 – December 11, 1979) was an American businessman and World War II veteran who served as one term a U.S. Representative from Indiana from 1947 to 1949.

Early life and career 
Born in Binghamton, New York, Mitchell attended the Binghamton schools and had three years of college training at the American Law Institute and Columbia University, New York City.
He moved to Evansville, Indiana, in September 1937.

He engaged as a warehouseman and later as district manager for a large food distributor 1934-1937.
In 1937 Mitchell purchased a half interest in a food marketing and brokerage company and served as president. At age twenty-seven after purchasing part of the company he had accumulated a net worth of over one million dollars which with inflation would be around $15 million.

World War II 
Following his success in the food service industry he served in the United States Navy from November 1942 until his discharge as a lieutenant commander in January 1946, having been commanding officer of Underwater Demolition Teams in the Pacific Theater for two years. He was awarded the Silver Star Medal at Okinawa following his honourable discharge.

Congress 
Mitchell was elected as a Republican to the Eightieth Congress (January 3, 1947 – January 3, 1949). He was an unsuccessful candidate for reelection in 1948 to the Eighty-first Congress.

Late career 
He served as delegate in 1952 and 1956 to Republican National Conventions. In March 1971 Mitchell, who was sixty at the time, assaulted Congressman Hale Boggs, 57, to the floor in the men's room of the Statler Hilton during a Congressional dinner; Boggs threatened suit; Mitchell replied he "would meet Boggs in court or in gym". The original argument was due to Congressman Mitchell's objection to the abusive cracks that Boggs was making about the Nixon Administration.

Death 
Mitchell resided in Evansville, Indiana, where he died December 11, 1979. He was interred in Sunset Memorial Park.

References

1910 births
1979 deaths
Recipients of the Silver Star
Columbia University alumni
20th-century American naval officers
20th-century American politicians
Burials in Indiana
Republican Party members of the United States House of Representatives from Indiana
United States Navy personnel of World War II
Politicians from Binghamton, New York
Politicians from Evansville, Indiana